Warren Kurt Bickel is an American behavioral pharmacologist and the Virginia Tech Carilion Behavioral Health Research Professor at the Fralin Biomedical Research Institute in Virginia Tech's Carilion School of Medicine. He is also a professor of psychology at Virginia Tech and a professor of psychiatry and behavioral medicine in their Carilion School of Medicine, the director of Virginia Tech's Addiction Recovery Research Center, and the co-director of their Center for Transformative Research on Health Behaviors. He formerly served as editor-in-chief of Experimental and Clinical Psychopharmacology and as president of Division 28 (Psychopharmacology and Substance Abuse) of the American Psychological Association.

References

External links
Virginia Tech faculty page
Virginia Tech Psychology Department faculty page

Living people
American pharmacologists
American addiction physicians
Virginia Tech faculty
Academic journal editors
University of Kansas alumni
State University of New York at New Paltz alumni
Year of birth missing (living people)